Shoal River is a river located primarily in Okaloosa County, Florida, near the city of Crestview. It is a tributary of the Yellow River, emptying into Pensacola Bay.

References

Rivers of Okaloosa County, Florida